Trident Records released 6 albums from influential jazz musicians.   Keno Duke is best known for his album Sense of Values on Strata-East Records, which happens to also feature Strozier and Mabern.  Dick Griffin also released an album on Strata-East.

Discography
TRS-501: Keno Duke & Contemporaries - Crest Of The Wave (1975)
TRS-502: Frank Strozier	- Dance, Dance
TRS-503: Ted Curson - (Typical Ted)
TRS-504: Dick Griffin - Now Is The Time (1979)
TRS-506: Harold Mabern - Pisces Calling
TRS-507: Benny Powell - Coast to Coast (1982)

External links
Discogs

American record labels
Jazz record labels